Valeriya Valerievna Zabruskova (born 29 July 1975) is a Russian track and field athlete who specializes in the javelin throw. Her personal best is 64.49 metres, achieved in June 2003 in Tula.

International competitions

References

Page at infosport.ru, including picture

1975 births
Living people
Russian female javelin throwers
Olympic female javelin throwers
Olympic athletes of Russia
Athletes (track and field) at the 2004 Summer Olympics
World Athletics Championships athletes for Russia
Russian Athletics Championships winners